The Drum is an Australian nightly television current affairs and news analysis program hosted by Julia Baird and Ellen Fanning. The program airs in the primetime slot of 6:00 pm weekdays on ABC TV and is aired later on the ABC News Channel at 9:00 pm AEDT.

The program is broadcast nationally across Australia, live from the ABC's headquarters in Sydney, with a special "week in review" episode broadcast on Saturday evening.  It is also streamed live on iview, and broadcast in over 40 countries across the Asia/Pacific region on the ABC's international channel, ABC Australia.

The program brings together a panel of prominent experts and high-profile opinion-leaders to discuss the key issues gripping or confounding Australia.

History 
The program premiered in 2010 with the launch of the ABC's 24-hour news channel. In May 2014, The Drum moved from the ABC News Channel to the ABC's primary channel with a new look, new timeslot of 5:30 pm, and a new 30-minute format.

In January 2019 the program was relaunched again, moving to the prime timeslot of 6 pm on ABC TV, ahead of the network's flagship news bulletin.

The relaunch was seen as a push to take on commercial rivals in the primetime slot, and the show was given a new set and look, and a new hour–long format.

The program is hosted by Australian journalists Julia Baird and Ellen Fanning. Stan Grant is the usual fill-in presenter when they are unavailable.

Annabel Crabb, Chris Uhlmann, Hamish Macdonald, Fran Kelly, Peter van Onselen and John Barron have hosted the show in the past.

A lighter, more relaxed summer version of the program is broadcast each January, hosted by Adam Spencer.

See also

 List of Australian television series
 List of Australian Broadcasting Corporation programs
 List of longest-running Australian television series

References

Australian Broadcasting Corporation original programming
2010 Australian television series debuts
ABC News and Current Affairs
Australian non-fiction television series
Television shows set in Sydney
English-language television shows